The 1984–85 SMU Mustangs men's basketball team represented Southern Methodist University during the 1984–85 men's college basketball season. There, they defeated Old Dominion to advance to the Second Round. In the Second Round, they lost to the #4 seed Loyola (IL), 70–57.

Roster

Schedule

|-
!colspan=9 style=| Southwest tournament

|-
!colspan=9 style=| 1985 NCAA tournament

Team players drafted into the NBA

References 

SMU Mustangs men's basketball seasons
SMU
SMU
SMU
SMU